Eamonn Doyle (born 1969) is an Irish photographer, electronic music producer, DJ, and owner/manager of the D1 Recordings record label. He has produced a number of records of his own music. His self-published photo-books include the trilogy i (2014), ON (2015) and End (2016), set in Dublin where he lives. He founded and ran the Dublin Electronic Arts Festival from 2001 to 2009.

Ian Maleney wrote in The Irish Times in 2015 that "D1 is considered one of the most important chapters in recent Irish music history". Martin Parr declared i "the best street photobook in a decade".

Early life and education
Doyle was born in Dublin. He studied commercial photography in Dún Laoghaire College of Art and Design (1988–1991).

Music
Doyle worked in the independent music business for 15 years. Around 1993 he and others set up a recording studio in the basement of the building he lived in at 147 Parnell Street in Dublin's north inner city. Some of that music was released on the Dead Elvis indie record label he co-founded and ran. Doyle became a DJ, then founded the techno record label D1 Recordings (named after the postcode it was located in) in 1994 which released music by artists from Dublin and elsewhere. D1 Recordings also ran a recording studio (d1), record shop and, eventually, a distribution company (Dublin Distribution) all in the same Parnell Street building. D1 also ran a weekly club night on Saturday nights for over a decade. The label resurfaced in 2018 in preparation for their 25th anniversary vinyl boxset release. Ian Maleney wrote in The Irish Times in 2015 that "D1 is considered one of the most important chapters in recent Irish music history". Doyle also set up two subsidiary labels called D1aspora [Distributed via Submerge in Detroit] and DublinLondon with UK electronic music producer Mark Broom.  

Doyle produces and releases his own music through D1 Recordings and various other labels on 12" records and for download. He also produces music with Scott Logan as Active Service Unit.

Dublin Electronic Arts Festival
Doyle founded the Dublin Electronic Arts Festival (DEAF) in 2001 which he ran until 2009. The annual festival would take place over the course of nearly a week with events in venues across the city.

DEAF closed when both Arts Council funding and sponsorship money stopped due to the post-2008 Irish economic downturn.

Photography
Doyle returned to photography in 2008, making street photographs of people on Parnell Street and O'Connell Street. He produced a trilogy of self-published photo-books on Dublin that were well received.

i (2014) was inspired by Samuel Beckett. Doyle's subjects were elderly working-class people photographed "from above, as if looming over them while they went about their daily business." Martin Parr declared it "the best street photobook in a decade".
In ON (2015) "the location remains the same – Parnell Street and O’Connell Street in Dublin – but, this time, the subjects are younger and more varied in terms of ethnicity. Whereas i evoked an almost timeless Dublin, On shows a markedly contemporary city, where people stride purposefully onward, intent on their destination rather than their journey."
End (2016) concluded the trilogy.
K (2018) was made at the western Atlantic edge of Ireland.

Publications

Photography books by Doyle

State Visit. Dublin: Self-published / D1, 2013.
i. Dublin: Self-published / D1, 2014. Edition of 750 copies.
ON. Dublin: Self-published / D1, 2015. . Edition of 999 copies (333 in each colour).
End. Dublin: Self-published / D1, 2016. Photographs by Doyle, drawings by Niall Sweeney and ambient soundtrack by David Donohoe. . 13 sections and a 7" vinyl record, housed in a slipcase. Edition of 1000 copies.
K. Dublin: Self-published / D1, 2018. Photographs by Doyle, music by David Donohoe. Includes a 10" vinyl record. Edition of 1000 copies.
 Made In Dublin. London: Thames & Hudson, 2019. Photographs by Doyle, text by Kevin Barry. 
 Eamonn Doyle. RM/Fundación Mapfre, 2020. Photographs by Doyle, text by Sweeney, David Donohoe, Bob Quinn, Lisa Godson. 
O. Self-published / D1, 2020. Edition of 250 copies. .

Other photography publications by Doyle
One. Self-published / D1, 2021. Edition of 300 copies. .
Two. Self-published / D1, 2022. Edition of 300 copies. .

Photography books with contributions by Doyle
Moral Phobia: ein Zeitgeist-Glossar von Achtsamkeit bis Zigarette. Berlin: Gudberg Nerger, 2015. By Judith Mair and Bitten Stetter. . Includes Doyle's i series.
Mono Vol 2. London: Goma, 2015. . Includes Doyle's ON series.
CPHOTO - Street - Calle. Ivory Press, Spain. 
ARLES 2016 Les Recontres De La Photographie. France .
100 Great Street Photographs. Prestel .
The Grain of the Present. San Francisco: Pier 24 Photography, 2018. . Edition of 1000 copies.
Off The Wall - Cultures Photo 10. Paris.
Prix Pictet 07: Space. London: teNeues, 2017. .
Landskrona Foto: View Ireland. 2016. Sweden. .

Exhibition catalogues
John McMahon, Eamonn Doyle: i, IRL — Landskrona Foto View: Ireland, Landskrona, Sweden, 2016
Eamonn Doyle: End., Arles 2016, Les Rencontres de la Photographie, France, 2016
Eamonn Doyle: i and State Visit, The Grain of the Present, Pier 24 Gallery, USA, 2017
Eamonn Doyle: ON, Nuit de la Photo, La Chaux-de-Fonds, Switzerland, 'The Collectors Vision: Martin Parr's, 2017
Best Photobooks — Eamonn Doyle, i, Photobook Phenomenon, RM, Spain, 2017

Discography

12" EPs

As Eamonn Doyle
Defect - D1 Recordings Vol. 1 (D1 Recordings, 1997)
Ghost of the Machine (Hertz, 2005) – edition of 300 copies
Red Shift (D1 Recordings, 2006)
Come Down on the Music (D1 Recordings, 2007)
The Red Queen (Lunar Disco, 2018)
Shelter  E.P.    (Piranha Records)

With Scott Logan as Active Service Unit
Favoured State / Variable, Active Service Unit (D1, 1997)
Allegro by Scott Logan (Paradiddle, 2001) – includes Township Jive by Doyle and Scott Logan, and Allegro (D1 Mix) remixed by Doyle

With David Donohoe as String Machine

String Machine CD (Goethe Institute, 2012)

Under various pseudonyms
Archive One [As The Seventh Earth Project] (D1, 2010)
Takin It Home" [As D1] - D1 25th Anniversary Compilation (D1, 2019)
Get of my planet by sundown" [As Seventh Earth Project] - D1 25th Anniversary Compilation (D1, 2019)
Mid-Term Break" [As LDR-21] - D1 25th Anniversary Compilation (D1, 2019)
If I make it to the end" [As H. Williams] - D1 25th Anniversary Compilation (D1, 2019)
Hi Frequency O" [As Extremdura] - D1 25th Anniversary Compilation (D1, 2019)
Loomereclipse" [Nnomae Elyod] - D1 25th Anniversary Compilation (D1, 2019)

Photography exhibitions

2020 
Eamonn Doyle, La Fundación Municipal de Cultura, Gijón, Spain

2019 
Eamonn Doyle, Fundación Mapfre Madrid, Spain
Eamonn Doyle, Michael Hoppen Gallery, London, UK
Eamonn Doyle, RHA Gallery Dublin, Ireland 2016
Dublin: Trilogie, Centre Photographique, Pôle Image Haute-Normandie, France
Eamonn Doyle: End., with drawings by Niall Sweeney and music by David Donohoe. L’Espace van Gogh, Rencontres d’Arles, France
Eamonn Doyle: End., Michael Hoppen Gallery, London

2015 
Eamonn Doyle: ON, Photo Ireland — The Library Project, Ireland

2014 
Eamonn Doyle: i, street installation [2014 – 2017], O’Connell Street, Dublin, Ireland
Eamonn Doyle: i, The Library Project, Dublin, Ireland 
COLLABORATIVE

2019 
Made In Dublin, Eamonn Doyle, Niall Sweeney, David Donohoe, Kevin Barry. Fundación Mapfre Madrid, Spain 
Made In Dublin, Eamonn Doyle, Niall Sweeney, David Donohoe, Kevin Barry. Photo London, Somerset House, London, UK 
Made In Dublin, Eamonn Doyle, Niall Sweeney, David Donohoe, Kevin Barry. RHA Gallery, Dublin, Ireland

2018 
Made In Dublin, Eamonn Doyle, Niall Sweeney, David Donohoe. ‘Where We Live’ festival, ThisIsPopBaby at The Complex, Dublin, Ireland 
GROUP

2019 
AIPAD, Pier 94, New York, USA 

Michael Hoppen Gallery, Grand Palais, Paris Photo, France

2017 
The Grain of the Present, Pier 24, San Francisco, USA

2016 
Annual Exhibition, RHA Gallery, Dublin, Ireland
Landskrona Foto View 2016, Sweden 
Michael Hoppen Gallery, The Armory Show, New York, USA
Photo London, Somerset House, London, UK
Solas Ireland, Fotohof, Salzburg, Austria
Solas Ireland, The Gallery of Photography, Dublin, Ireland

2015 
Annual Exhibition, RHA Gallery, Dublin, Ireland
Michael Hoppen Gallery, Grand Palais, Paris Photo, France

2014 
Michael Hoppen Gallery, Grand Palais, Paris Photo, France 
So Fine Art group show, Dublin, Ireland 

Annual Exhibition, RHA Gallery, Dublin, Ireland
New Works Award, Gallery of Photography, Dublin, Ireland

2012 
Annual Exhibition, RHA Gallery, Dublin, Ireland

2006 
Dublin Street Portraits, The Globe, Dublin, Ireland 

untitled installation, DEAF, Storehouse, Dublin, Ireland

1991 
Iontas Small Works, Sligo Art Gallery, Sligo, Ireland

Awards
2015: Curtin O'Donoghue Photography Prize, Royal Hibernian Academy, Dublin for "Westmoreland St, Dublin"
2015: Joint winner, Solas Ireland Award, Source and the Gallery of Photography, Dublin. The other winners were Ciarán Óg Arnold, Enda Bowe, Emer Gillespie, Shane Lynam, Dara McGrath and Yvette Monahan.

References

External links

D1 Recordings website

"Around Dublin with street photographer Eamonn Doyle – in pictures" in The Guardian
"Eamonn Doyle – O’Connell Street" at the British Journal of Photography

1969 births
Living people
Photographers from Dublin (city)
Irish electronic musicians
DJs from Dublin (city)